Sarvamangala is a 1968 Indian Kannada-language film, directed by Chaduranga based on his own novel of the same name. The film was produced by Doddammanni Urs. The film stars Rajkumar, K. S. Ashwath, Kalpana and Sampath. The film has musical score by Chellapilla Satyam.

Cast

 Rajkumar as Nataraja
 K. S. Ashwath
 Kalpana as Mangala
 Sampath
 M. Jayashree
 Mallikarjunappa
 Srirangamurthy
 Lakshmi Bai
 Chennappa
 Namadev
 Papamma
 M. N. Lakshmi Devi
 Shanthala
 C. K. Kalavathi
 Thara
 Vikram (credited as Master Vikram) as young Nataraja
 Girija (credited as Baby Girija) as young Mangala
 Sarvamangala (credited as Baby Sarvamangala)
 R. Gururaja Rao

Soundtrack
The music was composed by Chellapilla Satyam.

References

External links
 
 

1960s Kannada-language films
Films scored by Satyam (composer)